Mary Mills may refer to:

 Mary Mills (golfer) (born 1940), American retired professional golfer
 Mary Mills (soprano) (born 1964), American opera singer
 Mary Lee Mills, American nurse
 Bernice Orpha Redington (1891–1966), cookery writer using pen-name Mary Mills

See also
 Mary Mills Mississippi Gulf Coast Invitational